Meera Simhan is an English film and stage actress and writer. She appeared in Date Movie (2006) and several television and stage productions. She had a recurring role in Anger Management in 2013 and 2014. She was born in England and is now based in Los Angeles. She is married to actor Ravi Kapoor.

External links

English film actresses
Living people
Year of birth missing (living people)
English emigrants to the United States
Place of birth missing (living people)
English television actresses
21st-century English actresses
English people of Indian descent
British actresses of Indian descent